The 1969 Scheldeprijs was the 56th edition of the Scheldeprijs cycle race and was held on 29 July 1969. The race was won by Walter Godefroot.

General classification

References

1969
1969 in road cycling
1969 in Belgian sport